Conservation welfare is a proposed discipline which would focus on establishing the commonalities between conservation and animal welfare and the formation of a foundation upon which the two disciplines can collaborate to further their respective objectives. It would be based on the principles of Peter Singer's utilitarianism and similarly to compassionate conservation, its focus would diverge from environmental ethics in that it concentrates on the welfare of individual animals, rather than species, ecosystems or populations. It has been argued that conservation welfare would be distinct from compassionate conservation because the two disciplines have differing conceptions of the harms experienced by wild animals and that while conservation welfare would seek to engage with conservation scientists and integrate animal welfare into existing conservation practices, compassionate conservation may lack the capacity to "guide decision-making in complex or novel situations."

References

See also 
 Relationship between animal ethics and environmental ethics

Animal welfare
Environmental conservation
Environmental ethics